Caryocolum hispanicum is a moth of the family Gelechiidae. It is found in Spain and Greece.

The length of the forewings is about 5.5 mm for males and 5 mm for females. The forewings are mottled brown, but darker at the apex. There are indistinct orange-brown dorsal and subcostal patches. Adults have been recorded on wing in July.

References

Moths described in 1988
hispanicum
Moths of Europe